Lionel "Big Train" Billingy (born August 31, 1952) is a retired American basketball player and a basketball coach.

He played collegiately for the Duquesne University.

He was drafted by, and played for, the Virginia Squires (1974–75) in the American Basketball Association for 46 games.

As of 2006, he lives in Switzerland, where he coaches, holds youth basketball camps and works as a preacher.

External links

Basketball Camp page
sports-reference College Stats
NBA.com Stats

1952 births
Living people
Allentown Jets players
Basketball coaches from New York (state)
American expatriate basketball people in Belgium
American expatriate basketball people in France
American men's basketball players
Basketball players from New York (state)
Duquesne Dukes men's basketball players
Liège Basket players
Milwaukee Bucks draft picks
Virginia Squires draft picks
Virginia Squires players
Power forwards (basketball)